Martina Navratilova was the defending champion but did not compete at the Dow Classic in 1992.

Brenda Schultz won in the final against Jenny Byrne, 6–2, 6–2.

Seeds
The top eight seeds receive a bye into the second round.

  Zina Garrison (quarterfinals)
  Nathalie Tauziat (third round)
  Gigi Fernández (third round)
  Lori McNeil (quarterfinals)
  Natalia Zvereva (third round)
  Brenda Schultz (Champion)
  Pam Shriver (semifinals)
  Yayuk Basuki (third round)
  Larisa Savchenko-Neiland (quarterfinals)
  Jo Durie (semifinals)
  Mariaan de Swardt (second round)
  Patty Fendick (first round)
  Elna Reinach (second round)
  Mana Endo (second round)
  Kimberly Po (third round)
  Katrina Adams (first round)

Qualifying

Draw

Finals

Top half

Section 1

Section 2

Bottom half

Section 3

Section 4

References
 1992 Dow Classic Draws
 ITF Tournament Page
 ITF singles results page

Dow Classic - Singles
Singles